Minnunnathellam Ponnalla is a 1957 Indian Malayalam-language crime thriller film directed by R. Velappan Nair. It is a remake of the 1956 Hindi film CID and stars Sathyan, P. K. Sathyapal and Kumari Thankam. This was A. Janaki's debut Malayalam movie.

Plot 

Rajan is a detective who has come to investigate the murder of his friend, a newspaper editor. Rajan has to face numerous troubles during his investigation but he succeeds in finding the culprit and bringing him to justice.

Cast 
 Sathyan as Rajan
 P. K. Sathyapal as Dharmapalan
 G. K. Pillai as Judge
 K. P. Kottarakkara as newspaper editor
 Jose Prakash as Prosecutor
 T. S. Muthaiah as Pachan
 S. P. Pillai as Head Constable
 Anil Kumar as Vijayan
 Miss Kumari
 P. N. Menon as old man
 Mohanraj as Police Inspector
 Kozhikode Narayanan Nair as Nanu
 Santo Krishnan as Santo
 Pappi as Pappi
 Keshavan as Keshavan
 Kumari Thankam as Malathi
 K. V. Shanthi as Leela
 Adoor Pankajam as Kalyani

References

External links 
 

1950s Malayalam-language films
1950s crime thriller films
Indian crime thriller films
Malayalam remakes of Hindi films